The 1916 Buffalo All-Stars (or just "All-Buffalo" as they were known in local papers) played in the Buffalo Semi Pro Football division which was considered part of the New York Pro Football League and posted a 7-3-1 record.

Eugene F. Dooley played quarterback and also managed the team.

Schedule

References

Notes

Buffalo All-Americans seasons
Buffalo Prospects
1916 in sports in New York (state)